Katarína Dugovičová (born 3 February 1977) is a Slovak former footballer who played as a forward for the Slovakia national team.

Club career
Dugovičová has played for SKV Altenmarkt in the Austrian ÖFB-Frauenliga.

International career
Dugovičová has played for Slovakia at senior level during the UEFA Women's Euro 2009 qualifying.

Career statistics

International
Scores and results list Slovakia's goal tally first

References

1977 births
Living people
Slovak women's footballers
Women's association football forwards
ÖFB-Frauenliga players
Slovakia women's international footballers
Slovak expatriate footballers
Slovak expatriate sportspeople in Austria
Expatriate women's footballers in Austria